The 2015 National Hurling League was the 84th staging of the National Hurling League. Waterford won their first title since 2007 after a 1-24 to 0-17 win against Cork in the final on 3 May.	

TG4 and Setanta provided live coverage of the league with highlights shown on RTÉ2 on Sunday nights.

Format
34 teams play in the 2015 NHL. There are six teams in the top five divisions, and four teams in Division 3B. Each team plays each other once, either home or away. 2 points are awarded for a win, and 1 for a draw. Where two teams are level on points, the team that won the head-to-head match is ranked ahead. If this game was a draw, points difference (total scored minus total conceded in all games) is used to rank the teams. Where three or more teams are level on points, points difference is used to rank them.
Division 1A: Top four teams qualify for NHL quarter-finals. Bottom two teams play a relegation play-off, with the losing team relegated to Division 1B.
Division 1B: Top team promoted to 1A. Top four teams qualify for NHL quarter-finals. Bottom two teams play a relegation play-off, with the losing team playing a promotion-relegation match against the Division 2A champions.
Division 2A: Top two teams play Division 2A final, with the winning team playing a promotion-relegation match against the loser of the Division 1B relegation play-off. Bottom team relegated to Division 2B.
Division 2B: Top two teams play division final, with the winner being promoted. Bottom two teams play a relegation play-off, with the losing team playing a promotion-relegation match against the Division 3A champions.
Division 3A: Top two teams play Division 3A final, with the winning team playing a promotion-relegation match against the loser of the Division 2B relegation play-off. Bottom team relegated to Division 3B.
Division 3B: Top two teams play division final, with the winner being promoted.

Division 1A

Division 1A

Round Robin

Division 1A relegation play-off

Division 1B

Division 1B

Round Robin

Division 1B relegation play-off

Division 1B/2A promotion/relegation play-off

Division 1 Knockout

Division 1 Final stages

Division 1 Quarter-Finals

Division 1 Semi-Finals

Division 1 Final

Top scorers

Overall

Division 2

Division 2A

Round Robin

Division 2A Final

Division 2B

Round Robin

Division 2B Final

Division 2B relegation play-off

Division 2B/3A promotion/relegation play-off

Division 3

Division 3A

Round Robin

Division 3A Final

Division 3B

Round Robin

Division 3B Final

References

External links
Full Fixtures and Results

 
National Hurling League seasons